Käte Schaller-Härlin  (1877–1973) was a German painter.

Biography 
Schaller-Härlin née Härlin was born on 19 October 1877 in Mangalore, India. She was the daughter of missionary parents. She moved to Germany as a young woman and attended arts and crafts school in Stuttgart and the women's academy in Munich. Her teachers included Adolf Hölzel and Angelo Jank. She subsequently travelled through Italy, Spain, and France. She is known for her portraits and her collaborations with the architect Martin Elsaesser. Elsaesser designed churches and Schaller-Härlin produced wall and glass painting for the interiors.

She was married for a time to the German art historian Hans-Otto Schaller.  Schaller-Härlin died on 9 May 1973 in Stuttgart, Germany. In 2017 the Kunststiftung Hohenkarpfen Hausen (Hohenkarpfen Hausen Art Foundation) held a retrospective celebrating Schaller-Härlin's 140th birthday.

References

Further reading 
 

1877 births
1973 deaths
People from Mangalore
20th-century German women artists